Achille Simonetti (1838–1900) was a sculptor in Australia. He undertook many important commissions.

Early life
Simonetti was born in Rome, Italy, the son of a sculptor.

Career 
In 1871 James O'Quinn, Roman Catholic Bishop of Brisbane, persuaded Simonetti to immigrate to Brisbane, Queensland. By 1874 he moved to Sydney establishing a studio in Balmain.

Later life
Simonetti died after a two-week illness on 23 March 1900 at his residence and studio in Balmain, Sydney, New South Wales. He was buried in the Roman Catholic section of Rookwood Cemetery.

At the time of his death, he was designing on a statue of the late Queensland Premier Thomas Joseph Byrnes. Although there was a proposal that Simonetti's former pupil James White might continue the work, the commission was given to Melbourne sculptor Bertram Mackennal who completed the status in 1902. It was placed at the corner of Queen, Wickham, Ann and Boundary Streets in Brisbane (which was later redeveloped to create Centenary Place).

Significant works 
 1892: Lifesize statue of the late James O'Quinn for St Stephen's Roman Catholic Cathedral in Brisbane
 1897: Statue of Arthur Phillip, first Governor of New South Wales, in Sydney

References

19th-century Australian sculptors
1838 births
1900 deaths
Burials at Rookwood Cemetery
Australian Roman Catholics